Virgibacillus siamensis is a bacterium. It is Gram-positive, rod-shaped and moderately halophilic, originally isolated from fermented fish in Thailand. MS3-4T is the type strain (JCM 15395T =PCU 312T =TISTR 1957T).

References

Further reading
Da Silva, Neusely, et al. Microbiological Examination Methods of Food and Water: A Laboratory Manual. CRC Press, 2012.

External links

LPSN
UniProt entry

Bacillaceae
Bacteria described in 2011